The men's  T35-38 event at the 2008 Summer Paralympics took place at the  Beijing National Stadium on 16 September. There were no heats in this event. The winners were the team representing .

Results

Final
Competed at 19:36.

 
WR = World Record.  DNF = Did not finish. DQ = Disqualified (passing of the baton outside the take-over zone).

References
Official Beijing 2008 Paralympics Results: Final

Athletics at the 2008 Summer Paralympics